Ten Motives is an electronic cigarette company that in 2016 was taken over by British American Tobacco. 

Ten Motives was founded by Art Devlin who, with Tony Jones, was the controlling shareholder. In 2014, their advertising was ruled inaccurate.

BAT acquired the company after a deal with Electronic Cigarettes International Group failed to complete.

References

External links
Official website

Companies based in Cheshire
Electronic cigarette manufacturers
British American Tobacco